Aaron Townsend (born 4 July 1981) is an Australian professional golfer who plays on the PGA Tour of Australasia. He has also played a number of events on the European Tour, Challenge Tour and Web.com Tour.

Professional career
Townsend turned professional in 2003. His first professional win in a tour event came at the 2008 New South Wales Open, an event on the Von Nida Tour. Townsend won the event, hosted in his home region of Australia by seven strokes.

In 2009 Townsend won the Cellarbrations NSW PGA Championship on the PGA Tour of Australasia, finishing three strokes ahead of Scott Arnold and Michael Wright. In 2012 Townsend made his first appearance in a major championship at the 2012 Open Championship, following rounds of 70 and 74 he missed the cut by a single shot.

In February 2015 following five years without a win, Townsend won again on the PGA Tour of Australasia event at the Victorian PGA Championship, having holed a bunker shot on the final hole to win to tournament by a single stroke.

Professional wins (3)

PGA Tour of Australasia wins (2)

Von Nida Tour wins (1)

Results in major championships

Note: Townsend only played in The Open Championship.
CUT = missed the half-way cut

References

External links

Australian male golfers
PGA Tour of Australasia golfers
Sportspeople from Newcastle, New South Wales
Golfers from Sydney
1981 births
Living people